Ayushman Bhava is a 2019 Indian Kannada-language action drama film directed by P. Vasu and produced by B. S. Dwarakish and Yogish Dwarakish Bunggale, co-produced by Alankar Pandian. The film stars Shiva Rajkumar, Ananth Nag, Rachita Ram, and Prabhu along with Nidhi Subbaiah in a special appearance. The music was composed by Gurukiran. The cinematography and editing were handled by PKH Das and Gowtham Raju respectively.

The film was scheduled to be released on 1 November 2019, but was postponed to 15 November 2019.

Plot
Gopi is the head of a joint family consisting of his three sons, their wives, and children. When his family decides to punish him by not talking to him for consuming alcohol, he arranges advertises for a caretaker. The family apologizes later and is forgiven. Gopi's granddaughter Sridevi has her engagement. Krishna, who arrives with Sridevi's fiancée's family, wins everyone's hearts with his friendliness. When it is revealed that Krishna has come in response to Gopi's advertisement for a caretaker, Gopi immediately hires him.

Lakshmi is Gopi's other granddaughter, who became mentally insane after witnessing the death of her parents Devaki and Vasudeva, due to her parents, three years back. She lives in the outhouse. Krishna befriends Lakshmi, who later starts to recover. After Sridevi's wedding, the family decides to get Lakshmi married to Chetan, her cross-cousin, who just wants to inherit her wealth. Krishna suggests they get her married after she recovers fully, but is rebuked. The next day, it is discovered that Krishna has fled with Lakshmi. With the help of a boatwoman Chukki, they reach a music college.

With the help of music, Krishna helps Lakshmi, who loves music, regain her stability. Krishna and Lakshmi return to the joint family. After beating him up initially, when they find out that Lakshmi has fully recovered, the family apologizes. Lakshmi is told about her upcoming wedding. While Lakshmi thinks Krishna is the groom, the family has chosen Chetan. Krishna leaves the house. Lakshmi is shocked and returns to the outhouse. One of Gopi's friends reveals about Krishna's past. 

Past: Krishna's real name is Shivaram Krishna, son of a hospital chairman named Ram Kumar. One day, a rich businessman soon dies in the hospital, and the blame falls on Krishna's hospital. Krishna later learns that the businessman was actually killed by his partners. He managers to obtain evidence and decide to hand over to the CBI. The businessman's partners learn about this, and sends their henchman to kill him on the train. However, the henchmen instead kills  Lakshmi's parents, who had exchanged their seats with Krishna. On finding out that this incident made Lakshmi go insane, a guilty Krishna seeks Gopi's friend's help to take him to her house, so that he can help to treat her illness.

Present: Gopi calls Ram Kumar and reveals everything, but later learns that Krishna has left for Europe. However, Krishna arrives at Gopi's house and plays the tune of Lakshmi's song on the piano. Lakshmi meets Krishna, who refuses to take her with him though, since she has a loving family and cannot leave them. Gopi intervenes, and sends Lakshmi with Krishna, telling him that she is not leaving her family, but Krishna has joined their family.

Cast

 Shiva Rajkumar as Krishna
 Ananth Nag as Gopi
 Rachita Ram as Lakshmi
 Prabhu as Ram Kumar  
 Suhasini Maniratnam 
 Sadhu Kokila
 Ramesh Bhat
 Rangayana Raghu as Astrologist Raghu
 Yashwanth Shetty as Chethan 
 Nidhi Subbaiah as Chukki
 Arohita Gowda
 Anantha Velu 
 Giri Dwarakish 
 Sundar Ram 
 Veena Sundar 
 Swapna Raj 
 Lakshmi Siddayya 
 Rajesh Nataranga 
 Babu Hirannayya 
 Neenasam Ashwath 
 Mahesh Raj
 Nitesh Nittur

Release
The film was scheduled to be released on 1 November 2019, coinciding with Karnataka Rajyotsava day. It was later postponed to 15 November due to technical reasons.

Soundtrack

This is composer Guru Kiran's 100th film. Lyrics are by Santosh Naik and V. Nagendra Prasad.

Awards and nominations
In 9th South Indian International Movie Awards movie got 2 nominations.
 won the Best Actress - Rachita Ram
 nominated, Best supporting actress -Nidhi Subbaiah

References

External links
 

2010s Kannada-language films
Indian drama films
2019 films
Films directed by P. Vasu
Films scored by Gurukiran
2019 drama films